Ė ė is a letter of the Latin script, the letter E with a dot above.

Use
It is the 9th letter in the Lithuanian alphabet, and is also used in the Colognian language of Cologne, Germany, Potawatomi language and Cheyenne language. 

It was coined by Daniel Klein, the author of the first printed grammar of the Lithuanian language – Grammatica Litvanica (1653).

This character is also used in Croatian to denote the old yat alongside the more usual ě.

Transliteration
This character is also used in strict Library of Congress transliteration when transliterating the Cyrillic letter Э э into the Latin alphabet.

Computing codes

See also 
 Dot (diacritic)

References

EE
Lithuanian language